The 1981 Bucknell Bison football team was an American football team that represented Bucknell University as an independent during the 1981 NCAA Division I-AA football season.

In their sixth year under head coach Bob Curtis, the Bison compiled a 4–6 record. Ken Jenkins and Jeff Miller were the team captains.

Bucknell played its home games at Memorial Stadium on the university campus in Lewisburg, Pennsylvania.

Schedule

Roster

References

Bucknell
Bucknell Bison football seasons
Bucknell Bison football